Mahl is a surname. Notable people with the surname include:

Claire Mahl Moore (1912–1988), American artist
Evald Mahl (1915–2001), Estonian basketball player
Victor Mahl (1889–1915), English aviator

German-language surnames
surnames of German origin